Béla Várady (12 April 1953 – 23 January 2014) was a Hungarian football forward who played for Hungary in the 1978 FIFA World Cup.

Club career
A club legend with Vasas SC, he scored 174 league goals in 332 matches for them.

Death
Varady died on 23 January 2014.

References

External links
FIFA profile

1953 births
2014 deaths
Sportspeople from Borsod-Abaúj-Zemplén County
Association football forwards
Hungarian footballers
Hungary international footballers
1978 FIFA World Cup players
Olympic footballers of Hungary
Footballers at the 1972 Summer Olympics
Olympic silver medalists for Hungary
Olympic medalists in football
Vasas SC players
Tours FC players
Ligue 1 players
Ligue 2 players
Hungarian expatriate footballers
Expatriate footballers in France
Expatriate footballers in Austria
Medalists at the 1972 Summer Olympics